Litoxetine (developmental code names SL 81-0385, IXA-001) is an antidepressant which was under clinical development for the treatment of depression in the early 1990s but was never marketed. It acts as a potent serotonin reuptake inhibitor (Ki for  = 7 nM) and modest 5-HT3 receptor antagonist (Ki = 315 nM). It has antiemetic activity, and unlike the selective serotonin reuptake inhibitors (SSRIs), appears to have a negligible incidence of nausea and vomiting. The drug is structurally related to indalpine. Development of litoxetine for depression was apparently ceased in the late 1990s. However, as of March 2017, development of litoxetine has been reinitiated and the drug is now in the phase II stage for the treatment of urinary incontinence.

References

External links
 

5-HT3 antagonists
Antidepressants
Ethers
2-Naphthyl compounds
4-Piperidinyl compounds
Serotonin reuptake inhibitors